Jonni Peräaho (born 5 February 1994) is a Finnish professional footballer who plays as a midfielder.

References

1994 births
Living people
Finnish footballers
Turun Palloseura footballers
Åbo IFK players
Salon Palloilijat players
Veikkausliiga players
Ykkönen players
Kakkonen players
Association football midfielders
People from Uusikaupunki
Sportspeople from Southwest Finland